La tormenta is a Mexican telenovela produced by Miguel Alemán Velasco for Telesistema Mexicano in 1967.

Cast 
 Ignacio López Tarso as General Gabriel Paredes
 Columba Domínguez as Lorenza
 Amparo Rivelles as Lydia de Paredes
 Anita Blanch as Ana Valenzuela
 Maricruz Olivier as Lorenza "Loren" Paredes
 Enrique Lizalde as Gabriel Felipe Paredes
 Daniela Rosen as Cecilia Paredes
 José Carlos Ruiz as Benito Juárez
 Gerardo del Castillo as Ignacio Comonfort
 Jorge Mondragón as Melchor Ocampo
 Carlos Bracho as Teniente Fernández
 Andrea López as Doña Lucha Morán
 Fernando Mendoza as General Parodi
 Jorge Arvizu as Francisco I. Madero
 Luis Manuel Pelayo as Gustavo A. Madero
 Marina Marín as Dalia García
 Rosario Gálvez as Carmen Cerdán
 Raúl Dantes as Guillermo Prieto
 Aarón Hernán as Armando
 Luis Bayardo as Antonio
 Miguel Manzano as Don Alfonso
 Blanca Sánchez as Ángela
 Emily Kranz
 Mario Cid as Ignacio Zaragoza
 Lupelena Goyeneche
 Eduardo McGregor
 Héctor Sáez
 Guillermo Aguilar
 Julia Marichal

References

External links 

Mexican telenovelas
1967 telenovelas
Televisa telenovelas
Spanish-language telenovelas
1967 Mexican television series debuts
1967 Mexican television series endings